The Catubrini were a Gallic tribe dwelling in Cadore (Veneto) during the Roman period.

Name 
They are mentioned as Catubrinorum on inscriptions.

Geography 
The Catubrini lived in the region of Cadore (Catubrium), in the upper valley of the Piave river, north of Bellunum. Their territory was located south of the Saevates, west of the Ambilici and Carni, north of the Misquilenses, east of the Tuliassi.

References

Bibliography 

Historical Celtic peoples
Gauls